Bonamia is a genus of the flowering plant family Convolvulaceae, commonly known as the bindweed family  and named after the French physician and botanist François Bonamy (1710-1786). Members of the genus are commonly known as the lady's nightcap.

Species
The following species are recognized in the genus Bonamia:

B. abscissa (Choisy) Hallier f.
B. agrostopolis (Vell.) Hallier f.
B. alatisemina R.W.Johnson	
B. ankaranensis Deroin
B. apikiensis Deroin
B. apurensis D.F.Austin
B. austinii A.Moreira & Sim.-Bianch.
B. boivinii Hallier f.
B. boliviana O'Donell
B. brevifolia (Benth.) Myint	
B. campestris A.Moreira & Sim.-Bianch.
B. capitata (Dammer) Ooststr.
B. cerradoensis J.R.I.Wood
B. chontalensis E.Carranza
B. densiflora Hallier f.
B. deserticola R.W.Johnson
B. dietrichiana Hallier f.
B. douglasii D.F.Austin
B. elegans (Choisy) Hallier f.
B. elliptica (L.B.Sm. & B.G.Schub.) Myint & D.B.Ward
B. erecta R.W.Johnson
B. ferruginea (Choisy) Hallier f.
B. fruticosa R.W.Johnson	
B. gabonensis Breteler		
B. grandiflora (A.Gray) Hallier f. – Florida lady's nightcap
B. holtii O'Donell
B. jiviorum J.R.Grande
B. krapovickasii A.Moreira & Sim.-Bianch.
B. kuhlmannii Hoehne
B. langsdorffii (Meisn.) Hallier f.
B. leonii A.H.Gentry & Austin
B. linearis (R.Br.) Hallier f.
B. longipilosa R.W.Johnson
B. longitubulosa Breteler
B. maripoides Hallier f.
B. media (R.Br.) Hallier f.
B. menziesii A.Gray – Hawaii lady's nightcap
B. mexicana J.A.McDonald
B. mossambicensis (Klotzsch) Hallier f.
B. multicaulis (Brandegee) House
B. multiflora R.W.Johnson
B. ngouniensis Breteler
B. nzabii Breteler
B. oblongifolia Myint
B. ovalifolia (Torr.) Hallier f. – Bigpod lady's nightcap
B. pannosa (R.Br.) Hallier f.
B. peruviana Ooststr.
B. pilbarensis R.W.Johnson
B. riograndina J.R.I.Wood
B. rosea (F.Muell.) Hallier f.
B. rosiewiseae J.R.I.Wood	
B. sedderoides Rendle
B. semidigyna (Roxb.) Hallier f.
B. sericea (Griseb.) Hallier f.
B. spectabilis (Choisy) Hallier f.
B. sphaerocephala (Dammer) Ooststr.
B. subsessilis Hassl.
B. sulphurea (Brandegee) Myint & D.B.Ward
B. thunbergiana (Roem. & Schult.) F.N.Williams
B. toniae R.W.Johnson
B. trichantha Hallier f.
B. tsivory Deroin
B. umbellata (Choisy) Hallier f.
B. velutina Verdc.
B. vignei Hoyle
B. wilsoniae R.W.Johnson

References

External links

 
Convolvulaceae genera
Flora of North America
Taxonomy articles created by Polbot